Here for Now is the debut studio album by American electronic music DJ duo Louis the Child. It was released on June 26, 2020 through Interscope Records.

Track listing

  indicates an additional producer
  indicates a co-producer
  indicates a vocal producer

Personnel
Credits adapted from Tidal.

Louis the Child

 Robby Hauldren – arrangement , post-production , sampler , vocals , drum programming , synth bass , synthesizer programming , additional vocals , keyboards , programming , keyboards arrangement , bass programming , drums , synthesizer , background vocals , engineer , vocal arrangement , rhythm programming , additional keyboards , sound design 

 Freddy Kennett – computer music noises , sound design , post-production , programming , bass programming , drum programming , sampler , synth bass , engineer , keyboards , synthesizer , vocal arrangement , vocals , synthesizer programming , keyboards arrangement , piano , drums , percussion , background vocals , additional keyboards , rhythm arrangement , strings , arrangement 

Additional musicians

 Jarina de Marco – additional vocals 
 Josh Deane – samples , vocal arrangement 
 EarthGang – vocals 
 MNDR – vocals 
 Alexander 23 – additional vocals, guitar 
 Eric J Dubowsky – additional keyboards , bass programming , electric guitar , background vocals , bass guitar 
 Chelsea Cutler – vocals 
 Quinn XCII – vocals 
 Ariel Shrum – trumpet 
 Baraka May – vocal arrangement 
 Laura Jackman – vocal arrangement 
 K.Flay – vocals 
 Vera Blue – vocals 
 Jason Evigan – guitar 
 Mark Foster – vocals 
 Duckwrth – vocals 
 Jimmy Vallance – drum programming, synthesizer 
 Tom Howie – guitar, vocals 
 Drew Love – vocals 
 Couros Sheibani – synthesizer programming, vocal programming 
 Naomi Wild – vocals 
 Joe Memmel – additional vocals 
 Ryan Winnen – additional vocals 
 Chase Lawrence – bass, drum programming, guitar, keyboards, piano, vocals, whistle 
 BabyJake – vocals 

Technical

 Dale Becker – mastering engineer
 Eric J Dubowsky – mixer , engineer , vocal engineer , vocal mix 
 Josh Deane – engineer , post-production , production coordinator , vocal editing , recording engineer , recording arranger , editor 
 Eric Dan – engineer 
 Tristan Hooglan – engineer 
 Dylan McDougle – engineer 
 Jeff Ryon – engineer 
 Chase Lawrence – engineer 
 Isaac Valens – recording engineer 
 Jason Evigan – vocal engineer 
 Gian Stone – vocal engineer 
 Dan Shyman – vocal engineer 
 Matthew Curtin – assistant mixer

Charts

References

2020 debut albums
Interscope Records albums